Stepychevskaya is a rural locality (a village) in Shenkursky District, Arkhangelsk Oblast, Russia. The population was 28 as of 2010.

Geography 
Stepychevskaya is located on the Vaga River, 49 km north of Shenkursk (the district's administrative centre) by road. Trufanovskaya is the nearest rural locality.

References 

Rural localities in Shenkursky District